Knives and Skin is an American psychological thriller film, directed by Jennifer Reeder and released in 2019. Set in an unnamed small town in the American Midwest, the film centers on the disappearance of high school student Carolyn Harper (Raven Whitley), and explores its effect on the townspeople.

The film's cast also includes Ty Olwin, Marika Engelhardt, Marilyn Dodds Frank, Tim Hopper, Audrey Francis, Grace Smith, James Vincent Meredith, Robert T. Cunningham, Kayla Carter and Kate Arrington.

The film premiered at the 2019 Berlin International Film Festival, and had its American premiere at the Tribeca Film Festival.

Reception

Its consensus reads, "Knives and Skins daunting ambitions occasionally elude its grasp, but this remains a powerfully written and uniquely timely coming-of-age thriller." On Metacritic, the film has a weighted average score of 58 out of 100, based on 10 critics, indicating "mixed or average reviews".

References

External links

2019 LGBT-related films
2019 films
American LGBT-related films
American psychological thriller films
LGBT-related thriller films
2019 psychological thriller films
2010s English-language films
2010s American films